

Background

Current roster
As of June 18. 2012

USL Pro

Results summary

Match Results

US Open Cup

Match Results

References

Charlotte Eagles
Charlotte Eagles seasons
2012 in sports in North Carolina